Wajood is a 1998 Indian Hindi action film directed and produced by N. Chandra. The film features Nana Patekar and Madhuri Dixit in lead roles.

Plot
Malhar (Nana Patekar), who is born to a poor typist clerk, is a versatile character who wins trophies in dramas but is never appreciated by his father. While writing and directing dramas in his college he meets Apoorva (Madhuri Dixit), a very rich girl and falls madly in love with her. When she wins the Best Actress Award, she calls upon Malhar on stage and gives all the credit to him. Malhar misunderstands this gesture as Apoorva's love for him.

Meanwhile, Apoorva and Nihal (Mukul Dev) fall in love with each other. Nihal's father, who is a wealthy bureaucrat, decides to get them married. Malhar assumes that this marriage is against Apoorva's will and in his protest Nihal's father accidentally gets killed. Malhar is sent to jail. As Nihal loses his identity and status due to his father's death, Apoorva's father breaks off her engagement with Nihal. In jail, Malhar spends his days thinking of Apoorva, marrying her, having a child and living happily with his father; all in one family.
 
Malhar escapes from jail and then starts making quick money out of wrong ways. He starts seducing rich women and then looting them. He finds an accomplice in Sofia (Ramya Krishnan), who helps him in these crimes. She starts loving him madly but he continues to love Apoorva. Nihal, a police officer now, happens to meet Apoorva, a journalist now, to solve the mystery of the "stranger murderer" in the city. The Police Commissioner (Shivaji Satam) is under great pressure from the local political leader and also the public to nab the culprit. When Sofia learns that Malhar does not love her, but loves Apoorva, she is deeply disturbed and kills herself. Finally, when Malhar comes face to face with Apoorva, she tells him that she'd never loved him. Heart-broken, Malhar is then caught and dies dramatically in the end.

Cast
 Nana Patekar  as  Malhar Gopaldas Agnihotri / Col. Rathi 
 Madhuri Dixit  as  Apurva Choudhury 
 Mukul Dev  as  Nihal Joshi 
 Ramya Krishnan  as  Shalini / Sofia / Amina Twins Triple Role
 Johnny Lever  as  Inspector Rahim Khan  
 Dr. Hemu Adhikari  as  Gopaldas Raghavdas Agnihotri, Malhar's father 
 Suhas Joshi  as  Mrs. Abhijeet Joshi 
 Jagdeep  as  Bagh Singh 
 Kunika  as  Mrs. Chawla 
 Sanjay Mishra  as  Kanchan (camera operator) 
 Parikshit Sahni  as  Abhijeet Joshi, Nihal's father in a special role
 Tej Sapru  as  Apoorva's boss 
 Shivaji Satam  as  Police Commissioner of Mumbai 
 Rajeev Verma  as  Mr. Choudhury, Apoorva's father
 Gulzar  as  himself (presenting award) in a guest role

The film also features Rajdutt, Gick Grewal, Pushpa Verma, Geeta Shankar, Rajesh Singh, Paploo, Bhargava, Dhananjay and Dilawar Khan.

Soundtrack

All songs are composed by Anu Malik and penned by Javed Akhtar.

References

External links
 

1998 films
1990s Hindi-language films
Films directed by N. Chandra
Films scored by Anu Malik